Kathleen Laurel Sage is a freelance designer and embroiderer who produces a wide range of textile works, ranging from traditional items through to 3D pieces in machine embroidery and stump work. Sage is particularly well known for teaching classes on how to use soldering irons, heat tools and organza to create floral panels.

Biography
Kathleen has been interested by textiles for much of her life, she remembers "early childhood days spent round a table with my sister making cards, being taught to crochet and sewing patchwork hexagons."
Following this initial fascination she began to see textiles as a career path and studied in different areas of embroidery and design. Kathleen spent 9 years studying to gain City and Guilds part 1 & 2 in Patchwork and Quilting and part 1 & 2 in Embroidery. Then in 1998, Kathleen embarked on an OCN Diploma in Textiles at Treshem Institute in Kettering.
Having built up her skills over the years, Sage now shares her expertise through classes and talks that she hold both in the UK and around the world. Her classes cover a wide range of topics including mixed media work, hand embroidery, Gold Work, machine embroidery and dying fabrics.
On top of this she frequently contributes to national stitch and embroidery magazines such as Stitch from the Embroiderers' Guild.

Inspiration
Kathleen is based in rural Bedfordshire, England. The countryside landscape as well as the flowers and foliage in her own garden inspire a great deal of her designs. She has commented that she has a passion for "flowering floral and leaf designs featured strongly on the ceiling moulds, carvings, tiles and masonry of many of our English country houses with their idyllic designed gardens." This passion can be seen in her work where she uses machine stitching to recreate the designs she loves and then turns them in to 3D structures, fashion accessories and wall hangings.

Embroidered, Soldered and Heat Zapped Surfaces

In 2014, Kathleen published her first book Embroidered Soldered and Heat Zapped Surfaces. The book teaches readers how to use unconventional materials and tools to produces 3D designs. There are various projects for readers to try, such as how to make textured book by layering fabrics onto cotton.
The book's introduction show Kathleen's passion for organza and the work she creates with it "For many years I have been totally beguiled by the delicate see-through nature of organza materials. I love the huge array of colours available; plain, shot and rainbow to mention a few. They continue to amaze me giving so many more colours by simply overlaying them to obtain all the colours in between. With their see-through qualities gripping my attention, coloured acetate, synthetic net and other such synthetics occupy many of my rare play sessions."

References

Living people
Year of birth missing (living people)
Embroidery designers
British embroiderers